Frederick Wilkes (26 August 1883 -1942) was an English professional footballer who played for Reading and Tottenham Hotspur, as a defender

Football career 
Wilkes began his playing career at Reading. In 1908, the left back joined Tottenham Hotspur, between 1908-12 Wilkes made 60 appearances in all competitions for "Spurs".

References 

1883 births
1942 deaths
People from Warwickshire
English footballers
English Football League players
Reading F.C. players
Tottenham Hotspur F.C. players
Association football defenders